The Women's Individual Time Trial at the 1999 World Cycling Championships was held on Wednesday 7 October 1998 from Maastricht to Vilt, within the commune of Valkenburg aan de Geul. The race had a total distance of 23 kilometres. There were a total number of 42 competitors.

Final classification

References
Results

Women's Time Trial
UCI Road World Championships – Women's time trial
UCI